Diving competitions at the 2022 South American Games in Asuncion, Paraguay were held between October 2 and 5, 2022 at the Centro Acuático Nacional

Schedule
The competition schedule is as follows:

Medal summary

Medal table

Medalists

Men

Women

Participation
Six nations participated in diving events of the 2022 South American Games.

References

Diving
South American Games
2022
Qualification tournaments for the 2023 Pan American Games
2022 South American Games